Neurofeedback (NFB), also called neurotherapy, is a type of biofeedback that presents real-time feedback from brain activity in order to reinforce healthy brain function through operant conditioning. Typically, electrical activity from the brain is collected via sensors placed on the scalp using electroencephalography (EEG), with feedback presented using video displays or sound. The effectiveness of neurofeedback is disputed. While studies and reviews have often found neurofeedback treatment to be beneficial for the patient, it has yet to be shown these effects are directly caused by the neurofeedback technique applied. Placebo-controlled trials have often found the control group to show the same level of improvement as the group receiving actual neurofeedback treatment, which suggests these improvements may be caused by secondary effects instead. Despite this controversy and never having gaining prominence in the medical mainstream, it has been practiced for over four decades. NFB is relatively non-invasive and is administered as a long-term treatment option, typically taking a month to complete. A 30-minute to 60-minute neurofeedback session is typical.

Several neurofeedback protocols exist, with potential additional benefit from use of quantitative electroencephalography (QEEG) or functional magnetic resonance imaging (fMRI) to localize and personalize treatment. Related technologies include functional near-infrared spectroscopy-mediated (fNIRS) neurofeedback, hemoencephalography biofeedback (HEG) and fMRI biofeedback.

History 

In 1924, the German psychiatrist Hans Berger connected a couple of electrodes (small round discs of metal) to a patient's scalp and detected a small current by using a ballistic galvanometer.  During the years 1929–1938 he published 14 reports about his studies of EEGs, and much of our modern knowledge of the subject, especially in the middle frequencies, is due to his research. Berger analyzed EEGs qualitatively, but in 1932 G. Dietsch applied Fourier analysis to seven records of EEG and became the first researcher of what later is called QEEG (quantitative EEG).

The first study to demonstrate neurofeedback was reported by Joe Kamiya in 1962. Kamiya's experiment had two parts. In the first part, a subject was asked to keep his eyes closed and when a tone sounded to say whether he thought he was in alpha. He was then told whether he was correct or wrong. Initially the subject would get about fifty percent correct, but some subjects would eventually develop the ability to better distinguish between states. Many could then produce alpha and non-alpha states at will. In the second part of the study, a tone was sounded whenever alpha was present, and subjects were asked to increase the percentage time the tone was on. Most participants were able to increase their percent time spent in alpha within about four training sessions. Maintaining the alpha state was found to be associated with relaxation, a sense of "letting go", and pleasant affect. High alpha amplitude had been seen in advanced meditators, combined with an emerging counter-cultural interest in altered states of consciousness, led to significant public interest in alpha training as an alternative to psychedelic drugs. Several optimistic studies replicated Kamiya's findings and suggested alpha training could be useful for treating stress and anxiety. However, other studies found that alpha was not reliably associated with calm and pleasant mental states, while eyes-closed alpha never increased above the resting baseline. Hardt and Kamiya (1976) argued that the replication failures were an artifact of an incorrect method of measuring alpha, and future studies continued to demonstrate learning of alpha based on feedback.

In the late sixties and early seventies, Barbara Brown, one of the most effective popularizers of Biofeedback, wrote several books on biofeedback, making the public much more aware of the technology.  The books included New Mind New Body, with a foreword from Hugh Downs, and Stress and the Art of Biofeedback. Brown took a creative approach to neurofeedback, linking brainwave self-regulation to a switching relay which turned on an electric train.

The work of Barry Sterman, Joel F. Lubar and others has been relevant on the study of beta training, involving the role of sensorimotor rhythmic EEG activity. This training has been used in the treatment of epilepsy, attention deficit disorder and hyperactive disorder. The sensorimotor rhythm (SMR) is rhythmic activity between 12 and 16 hertz that can be recorded from an area near the sensorimotor cortex. SMR is found in waking states and is very similar if not identical to the sleep spindles that are recorded in the second stage of sleep.

For example, Sterman has shown that both monkeys and cats who had undergone SMR training had elevated thresholds for the convulsant chemical monomethylhydrazine. These studies indicate that SMR may be associated with an inhibitory process in the motor system.

In the 2000s, neurofeedback took a new approach in taking a look at deep states. Alpha-theta training has been tried with patients with alcoholism, other addictions as well as anxiety. This low frequency training differs greatly from the high frequency beta and SMR training that has been practiced for over thirty years and is reminiscent of the original alpha training of Elmer Green and Joe Kamiya. Beta and SMR training can be considered a more directly physiological approach, strengthening sensorimotor inhibition in the cortex and inhibiting alpha patterns, which slow metabolism. Alpha-theta training, however, derives from the psychotherapeutic model and involves accessing of painful or repressed memories through the alpha-theta state. The alpha-theta state is a term that comes from the representation on the EEG.

A recent development in the field is a conceptual approach called the Coordinated Allocation of Resource Model (CAR) of brain functioning which states that specific cognitive abilities are a function of specific electrophysiological variables which can overlap across different cognitive tasks. The activation database guided EEG biofeedback approach initially involves evaluating the subject on a number of academically relevant cognitive tasks and compares the subject's values on the QEEG measures to a normative database, in particular on the variables that are related to success at that task.

Organizations
The Society of Applied Neuroscience (SAN) is an EU-based nonprofit membership organization for the advancement of neuroscientific knowledge and development of innovative applications for optimizing brain functioning (such as neurofeedback with EEG, fMRI, NIRS). The International Society for Neurofeedback & Research (ISNR) is a membership organization aimed at supporting scientific research in applied neurosciences, promoting education in the field of neurofeedback.

The Foundation for Neurofeedback and Neuromodulation Research is a non-profit organization that, through donations, provides grants for student research. The FNNR also issues awards for professionals and publishes books related to neurofeedback.

The Association for Applied Psychophysiology and Biofeedback (AAPB) is a non-profit scientific and professional society for biofeedback and neurofeedback. The International Society for Neurofeedback and Research (ISNR) is a non-profit scientific and professional society for neurofeedback. The Biofeedback Federation of Europe (BFE) sponsors international education, training, and research activities in biofeedback and neurofeedback.

Certification

The Biofeedback Certification International Alliance (formerly the Biofeedback Certification Institute of America) is a non-profit organization that is a member of the Institute for Credentialing Excellence (ICE). BCIA certifies individuals who meet education and training standards in biofeedback and neurofeedback and progressively recertifies those who satisfy continuing education requirements. BCIA offers biofeedback certification, neurofeedback (also called EEG biofeedback) certification, and pelvic muscle dysfunction biofeedback certification. BCIA certification has been endorsed by the Mayo Clinic, the Association for Applied Psychophysiology and Biofeedback (AAPB), the International Society for Neurofeedback and Research (ISNR), and the Washington State Legislature.

The BCIA didactic education requirement includes a 36-hour course from a regionally accredited academic institution or a BCIA-approved training program that covers the complete Neurofeedback Blueprint of Knowledge and study of human anatomy and physiology. Applicants must also pass a written exam, complete 25 hours of mentoring, 10 case reviews, perform 100 hours of client sessions, and conduct 10 hours of personal NF. The Neurofeedback Blueprint of Knowledge areas include: I. Orientation to Neurofeedback, II. Basic Neurophysiology and Neuroanatomy, III. Instrumentation and Electronics, IV. Research, V. Psychopharmacological Considerations, VI. Treatment Planning, and VII. Professional Conduct.

Applicants may demonstrate their knowledge of human anatomy and physiology by completing a course in biological psychology, human anatomy, human biology, human physiology, or neuroscience provided by a regionally accredited academic institution or a BCIA-approved training program or by successfully completing an Anatomy and Physiology exam covering the organization of the human body and its systems.

Applicants must also document practical skills training that includes 25 contact hours supervised by a BCIA-approved mentor designed to teach them how to apply clinical biofeedback skills through self-regulation training, 100 patient/client sessions, and case conference presentations. Distance learning allows applicants to complete didactic coursework over the internet. Distance mentoring trains candidates from their residence or office. They must recertify every four years, complete 55 hours of continuing education (30 hours for Senior Fellows) during each review period or complete the written exam, and attest that their license/credential (or their supervisor's license/credential) has not been suspended, investigated, or revoked.

Neuroplasticity
In 2010, a study provided some evidence of neuroplastic changes occurring after brainwave training. Half an hour of voluntary control of brain rhythms led in this study to a lasting shift in cortical excitability and intracortical function.  The authors observed that the cortical response to transcranial magnetic stimulation (TMS) was significantly enhanced after neurofeedback, persisted for at least 20-minutes, and was correlated with an EEG time-course indicative of activity-dependent plasticity

Effectiveness 
There is significant controversy about the effectiveness of treating psychiatric disorders using EEG neurofeedback. While studies and meta-analyses often note apparent positive effects, it is yet to be shown conclusively that this effect is directly related to the neurofeedback, and not caused by secondary or placebo effects  Additionally, meta-analyses and reviews tend to emphasize that different neurofeedback protocols should be considered entirely different treatment methods, further increasing the difficulty of drawing conclusions about neurofeedback in general.

A double-blinded, sham-controlled study of neurofeedback as a treatment for insomnia found that neurofeedback did not beat placebo.

Reviews into the effectiveness of neurofeedback for ADHD have found neurofeedback to have durable effects following treatment, although double-blind placebo-controlled studies show the control group will experience very similar improvements to the treatment group, suggesting improvements were not caused by a specific treatment method, but by secondary effects not directly related to neurofeedback.

Results are inconclusive about whether neurofeedback is an effective treatment for depression, post-traumatic stress disorder (PTSD), or developmental trauma. Similarly, systematic reviews about its effectiveness as a treatment for traumatic brain injuries or strokes have not been able to produce conclusive results.

More conclusive evidence exists for its effectiveness as a treatment for epilepsy and seizure disorders. Patients who had been unable to control their condition with medication were the focus of numerous studies, and meta-analysis has yielded generally promising results.

No neurofeedback device has yet been approved by FDA for treatment of ADHD. In 2019, the FDA permitted marketing of the first medical device (external Trigeminal Nerve Stimulation or eTNS) for treatment of ADHD. eTNS is a nerve stimulation and not a neurofeedback device.

Non-medical applications
The applications of neurofeedback to enhance performance extend to the arts in fields such as music, dance, and acting. A study with conservatoire musicians found that alpha-theta training benefitted the three music domains of musicality, communication, and technique.  Historically, alpha-theta training, a form of neurofeedback, was created to assist creativity by inducing hypnagogia, a "borderline waking state associated with creative insights", through facilitation of neural connectivity.  Alpha-theta training has also been shown to improve novice singing in children. Alpha-theta neurofeedback, in conjunction with heart rate variability training, a form of biofeedback, has also produced benefits in dance by enhancing performance in competitive ballroom dancing and increasing cognitive creativity in contemporary dancers. Additionally, neurofeedback has also been shown to instil a superior flow state in actors, possibly due to greater immersion while performing.

Neurofeedback has been used to improve athletic psychomotor and self-regulation ability. Sensorimotor rhythm neurofeedback training of accuracy has been used in top-level sports, especially in target-based sports (e.g. golf). Neurofeedback training of shooting accuracy in elite football has been employed by the German company neuro11 at Liverpool FC since the summer of 2021.

However, randomized control trials have found that neurofeedback training (using either sensorimotor rhythm or theta/beta ratio training) did not enhance performance on attention-related tasks or creative tasks. It has been suggested that claims made by proponents of alpha wave neurofeedback training techniques have yet to be validated by randomized, double-blind, controlled studies, a view which even some supporters of alpha neurofeedback training have also expressed.

See also 
 Brainwave synchronization
 Decoded neurofeedback
 Comparison of neurofeedback software
 Mind machine

References

Further reading

External links 
 BBC article about neurofeedback improving the performance of musicians

Devices to alter consciousness
Medical tests
Electroencephalography
Evoked potentials
Neurotechnology
Behaviorism
Attention deficit hyperactivity disorder management
Alternative medical systems
Naturopathy
Neuropsychology